Fidel Suárez Cruz is a Cuban farmer  from Pinar del Río.

He became an independent librarian and a member of the pro-democracy Party for Human Rights in Cuba. He was arrested during the 2003 crackdown on dissidents and summarily sentenced to jail. Amnesty International recognized him as a prisoner of conscience.

See also
 Cuban democracy movement

References

External links
 Payolibre.com profile
 Fidel Suárez Cruz Freedom Collection interview

Amnesty International prisoners of conscience held by Cuba
Cuban dissidents
Cuban farmers
Cuban librarians
Living people
Cuban prisoners and detainees
Year of birth missing (living people)